Greg Fox (born 1961) is an American cartoonist, known for his long-running strip Kyle's Bed & Breakfast.

Fox began making comics at 12 years old, publishing his first strip at age 14 and continuing to illustrate and create editorial cartoons in college. He received a B.A. from Geneseo College. His work has appeared in national publications for companies such as Revolutionary Comics, Triumphant Comics, and Marvel Comics.

Fox began producing Kyle's Bed & Breakfast in 1998. The strip runs in a variety of publications across North America, as well as on the web. He published the first book collection of Kyle's B&B in September 2004; it was a nominee in the Humour category at the 2005 Lambda Literary Awards. Two additional collections have been published since: A Second Bowl of Serial and Hot Off the Griddle.

Fox currently resides in Northport, Long Island, New York. He is openly gay.

Works 
 Fox, Greg. Kyle's bed & breakfast / Greg Fox. New York, NY : Kensington Books, 2004. 140 p.; chiefly ill.; 28 cm.  (pbk.)

References

External links
 Kyle Comics official site

1961 births
American comic strip cartoonists
American gay artists
LGBT comics creators
Living people
People from Northport, New York